Al Qahab  (also as  or )) is a village in the sub-governorate of Bariq in  the province of Asir, Saudi Arabia.
In the center of the village is its archaeological fort, which is a dark-coloured rock - dusty - cut, which was used with ingenious intelligence to form some building walls, which made the fort appear as if it was growing from the hollow of the rock. The age of this fort is about four hundred years, and some estimate it more than that because there are traces close to it dating back to the early ages of Islam.

See also 

 List of cities and towns in Saudi Arabia
 Regions of Saudi Arabia

References 

Populated places in 'Asir Province
Populated coastal places in Saudi Arabia
Populated places in Bareq